Zhaliang  of Cha leung(), literally "fried two," is a Cantonese dim sum. It is made by tightly wrapping rice noodle roll around youtiao (fried dough). It can be found in Chinese restaurants in Guangdong, Hong Kong, Macau and Malaysia.

It is often served doused in soy sauce, hoisin sauce or sesame paste and sprinkled with sesame seeds. It is usually eaten with soy milk or congee.

See also 
 Dim sum
 List of fried dough varieties 
 Ci fan tuan
 Youtiao

References

External links

Cantonese cuisine
Dim sum
Dumplings
Hong Kong cuisine